Vyacheslav Serhiyovych Tankovskyi (born 16 August 1995) is a Ukrainian professional footballer who plays as a midfielder for Metalist Kharkiv in the Ukrainian First League.

Career
Tankovskyi is a product of the FC Inter Dnipropetrovsk youth sportive school and signed a contract with FC Shakhtar Donetsk Football Academy in 2008.

He played three years for the FC Shakhtar Donetsk Reserves and Youth Team in the Ukrainian Premier League Reserves Championship and in July 2015 went on loan to FC Zorya in the Ukrainian Premier League. Tankovskyi made his debut for FC Zorya playing as a substitute player in a match against FC Stal Dniprodzerzhynsk on 2 August 2015 in the Ukrainian Premier League.

Career statistics

Club

Honours

Club
Shakhtar
Ukrainian Premier League: 2016–17, 2017–18
Ukrainian Cup: 2016–17, 2017–18
Ukrainian Super Cup: 2017

References

External links
 
 

1995 births
Living people
People from Novomoskovsk
Ukrainian footballers
Association football midfielders
Ukraine youth international footballers
Ukrainian Premier League players
Ukrainian First League players
FC Shakhtar Donetsk players
FC Zorya Luhansk players
FC Mariupol players
FC Arsenal Kyiv players
FC Metalist Kharkiv players
Sportspeople from Dnipropetrovsk Oblast